The First Commandment of the Ten Commandments may refer to:

 "I am the Lord thy God", under the Talmudic division of the third-century Jewish Talmud
 "Thou shalt have no other gods before me", under the Philonic division used by Hellenistic Jews and Protestants
 "Thou shalt not make unto thee any graven image", under the Augustinian division used by Roman Catholics and Lutherans

Other uses
 The First Commandment (novel), a 2007 novel by Brad Thor
 "The First Commandment" (Stargate SG-1), a television episode